"Song for Sophie (I Hope She Flies)" is a song by Danish singer-songwriter Aura Dione from her debut album Columbine. It was released as Dione's second single in 2007 in Denmark, following "Something from Nothing". In Germany, Austria and Switzerland, it was released on 27 April 2010 by Island Records as Dione's second single.

The song peaked at number twelve in Germany and at number eighteen in Austria. It also charted within Billboard's European Hot 100 Singles chart at number 49.

Track listings

Chart performance

Charts

Year-end charts

References

External links 

 

2010 singles
Aura Dione songs
Songs written by Aura Dione
2008 songs
Island Records singles